Alexander Vernon "Buck" Freeman (July 5, 1896 – February 21, 1953) was an American Major League Baseball pitcher who played for the Chicago Cubs in  and .

External links

Chicago Cubs players
1896 births
1953 deaths
Baseball players from Texas